Southern New Hampshire University (SNHU) is a private university between Manchester and Hooksett, New Hampshire. The university is accredited by the New England Commission of Higher Education, along with national accreditation for some hospitality, health, education and business  degrees. SNHU is one of the fastest-growing universities nationwide with 135,000 online students and 3,000 on campus.

History
The university was founded in 1932 by second-generation Russian Americans Harry A.B. "H.A.B." Shapiro, an accountant, and his wife, Gertrude Gittle Crockett Shapiro, as an institution focused on teaching business, under the name New Hampshire School of Accounting and Secretarial Science. H.A.B. Shapiro died in 1952; there were 25 students enrolled at that time, and his widow, who had increasingly administered the school as her husband's health declined, then ran the school until 1971, continuing as president emerita until 1986.

In 1961, the school was incorporated and renamed the New Hampshire College of Accounting and Commerce. The state of New Hampshire granted the college its charter in 1963, which gave it degree-granting authority. The first associate degrees were awarded that year, and the first bachelor's degrees were conferred in 1966. The college became a nonprofit institution under a board of trustees in September 1968, and its name was shortened to New Hampshire College in 1969.

The 1970s were a time of growth and change. The college moved from its downtown Manchester site to the now  campus along the Merrimack River, at the northern border of Manchester with the town of Hooksett, in 1971. Academic offerings expanded with the Master of Business Administration program in 1974, as well as the human services programs adopted from Franconia College, which closed in 1978.

In 1981, New Hampshire College received authorization from the New Hampshire legislature to offer Master of Science degrees in business-related subjects, as well as Master of Human Services degrees. (All human services programs would be transferred to Springfield College in Massachusetts by the end of the decade.) That same year, the college opened its North Campus on the site of the former Mount Saint Mary College, which had closed three years earlier. The North Campus became the home of the culinary arts program, which was established in 1983.

Ultimately, the North Campus was sold, and its academic programs were consolidated back to the main campus. This spurred several major construction projects on the main campus in the mid-1990s: Washington Hall, a residence hall; Webster Hall, home to the School of Business; the Hospitality Center, home of the Quill (a student-run restaurant) and culinary arts programs; and Belknap Hall, now home to the Institute for Language Education, the School of Education, and several university offices. In 1995, New Hampshire College began offering distance learning programs through the Internet. In 1998, the school expanded academic degrees to include a Ph.D. in community economic development and the Doctor of Business Administration.

New Hampshire College became Southern New Hampshire University on July 1, 2001. The same year, the university completed a new residence hall, New Castle Hall, followed by a new academic facility, Robert Frost Hall, containing the McIninch Art Gallery, in 2002. When nearby Notre Dame College closed, three of Notre Dame's graduate education programs and two undergraduate education programs transferred to SNHU.

When president Paul LeBlanc took over in 2003, the early 2000s recession had affected SNHU with rising tuition and shrinking enrollment. LeBlanc addressed this in 2009 with an increased focus on the College of Online and Continuing Education. Rapid revenue growth from the division helped save the struggling main campus where enrollment had slumped. SNHU focused on increasing graduation rates and adjusting the online college to meet the needs of working adults who comprise most of its student body.

Student housing continued to grow with Conway and Lincoln Halls opening in 2004, and Hampton and Windsor Halls in 2006. SNHU became New Hampshire's first carbon-neutral university in 2007, when president LeBlanc signed the American College & University Presidents' Climate Commitment The Academic Center and the Dining Center were completed by 2009.

A new 152-room residence hall, Tuckerman Hall, was opened in the fall of 2013. A  Learning Commons was opened in 2014, housing the library, the information technology help desk, a café, and media production services. The former Shapiro Library was reopened as the William S. and Joan Green Center for Student Success, a student center housing conference rooms and meeting space, along with student services for women, learning disabilities, veterans and other groups.

The university purchased naming rights to the downtown Manchester Civic Arena in September 2016, naming it SNHU Arena for at least 10 years in a deal that included internships for students and use of the facility for graduation and athletic events.

SNHU absorbed the faculty and staff at Daniel Webster College along with the engineering and aviation programs, operating the college's campus in Nashua for the rest of the 2016-17 academic year after its parent company, ITT Technical Institute, filed for bankruptcy. SNHU purchased the college's aviation facilities (including a flight center, tower building, and hangar) at Nashua Airport, for $410,000 and enrolled up to 30 students in their Aviation Operations and Management bachelor's degree program. An undisclosed Chinese university, which plans to open a satellite campus, outbid SNHU for the former campus. To accommodate the new students, SNHU converted an unused warehouse on campus into space for classrooms, laboratories, and a machine shop. A dedicated engineering and technology building was later completed in January 2020.

Three major construction projects were completed in 2017: the Gustafson Center, a new welcome center named for the former university president Richard A. Gustafson; Penmen Stadium, a 1,500-seat outdoor stadium; and Monadnock Hall, an apartment-style residence hall. In November 2017, the university announced a $100 million project including a 1,700 space parking garage and an additional 500 jobs at its downtown Manchester offices supporting the online college.

In 2017, a fire burned down Greely Hall, one of the original residence halls on campus. The fire forced 50 students to evacuate into a nearby hotel (provided by the university) until new accommodations could be made. Nobody was injured, and the students returned to on-campus housing within two days of the fire to select dormitories with extra space. No longer salvageable, the building was demolished to make additional space for a new dormitory, Kingston Hall, which opened in August 2018. In addition to Greely Hall, Kingston Hall replaced three other original dormitories on campus (Chocorua, Kearsarge, and Winnisquam halls).

In 2020, President LeBlanc reported that the school was on its way to reduce student tuition to $10,000 a year, which required a close look at inefficiencies in labor and programming.

Academics 

SNHU has an admissions rate of 88%.<ref name=":US Department of Education" In 2021, U.S. News & World Report ranked the university #131-171 in Regional Universities North.

Colleges and schools
Southern New Hampshire University offers undergraduate, graduate, doctoral, and certificate programs through its multiple colleges and schools. The colleges and schools that compose SNHU are:

College for America (CfA)
College of Engineering, Technology & Aeronautics (CETA)
College of Online & Continuing Education (COCE)
School of Arts & Sciences
School of Business
School of Education
School of International Engagement

Honors program
The three-year Honors Program is a custom-designed, integrated academic experience that is offered over the course of six semesters for business majors. As a result, students earn an undergraduate business degree in three years rather than four. It was started using a challenge grant from the U.S. Department of Education in 1995. SNHU offers similar accelerated programs to undergraduate students majoring in creative writing and justice studies as well.

Faculty
SNHU's faculty consists of 161 full-time instructors, 5,798 part-time instructors, and 20 instructional graduate assistants. According to The Century Foundation, SNHU spent more than $11 million on advertising from August 2016 to January 2017, and only 18 cents for every dollar was spent on instruction.

Regional centers
Southern New Hampshire University's COCE offers programs both online and at its three regional centers. The university's main campus serves as a regional center, in addition to satellite campuses in Salem, New Hampshire and Brunswick, Maine.

After Trinity College in Vermont closed in 2001, SNHU established the Vermont Center in Colchester, which houses the field-based graduate program in education.

Online programs

Enrollment in the College of Online & Continuing Education (COCE), based in downtown Manchester, has increased rapidly: from 8,000 students in 2001 to 34,000 in 2014, to over 135,000 according to SNHU. As the online program has grown, the COCE has hired more full-time professors (as of 2014, most of the more than 2,700 faculty members were part-time instructors located throughout the United States and abroad). Alumni and educators outside SNHU have criticized the university's aggressive recruiting techniques and nationwide advertising campaigns, comparing them to those used by for-profit institutions such as the University of Phoenix and the now-defunct ITT Technical Institute. In response, president LeBlanc stated that SNHU has "borrowed the best of operational practices from the for-profits (customer service, data analytics, a sense of urgency and accountability) while eschewing the practices that cast them in such a poor light."

SNHU's College for America (CfA) offers degrees that rely on competency-based learning rather than traditional credit hours, based in part on programs at Western Governors University. In 2013, the CfA became the first of its kind to gain federal approval from the U.S. Department of Education. In 2017, it formed a partnership with the U.S. Office of Personnel Management, making all federal employees eligible for CfA courses.

Costs and student outcomes

Beginning in the fall of 2021, campus tuition will be reduced to $15,000 per year (and $10,000 per year for select programs). The graduation rate for campus students is 68% and median salary after attending is $45,800. In the 2017–2018 award year, 43,067 students received the federal Pell Grant.

Accreditation and memberships
Since 1973, Southern New Hampshire University has been accredited by the New England Association of Schools and Colleges and is approved by the New Hampshire Department of Education Division of Higher Education—Higher Education Commission. The School of Business is accredited by the Accreditation Council for Business Schools and Programs. Some programs have specialized accreditation, such as the sport management programs, which are recognized by the North American Society for Sport Management, and the hospitality administration program, which is recognized by the Accreditation Commission for Programs in Hospitality Administration.

Nationally, it is a member of the Association of American Colleges and Universities, the American Council on Education, and the National Association of Independent Colleges and Universities. At the state level, it is a member of the New Hampshire College & University Council (NHCUC), a consortium of higher learning institutions in New Hampshire.

Recognitions and awards 
The university's community economic development program received a 2007 New England Higher Education Excellence Award, the Robert J. McKenna award, named for the former Rhode Island state senator and New England Board of Higher Education chair. It is presented each year to an outstanding academic program.

In 2012, Fast Company named SNHU the 12th most innovative organization in the world in its World's 50 Most Innovative Companies edition.

In 2013, the university was recognized by The Chronicle of Higher Education as one of the best colleges for which to work.

In 2014, the School of Business and the COCE won multiple "Best of Business" Awards, for Best MBA Program and Best Online Degree Program, respectively. These awards are presented annually by the New Hampshire Business Review.

U.S. News & World Report ranked Southern New Hampshire University at #112 in Regional Universities North (out of 196 institutions), and #1 in Most Innovative Schools in the 2019 rankings.

Student activities
Southern New Hampshire University has many student organizations on campus, including Radio SNHU (the campus radio station) and The Penmen Press (the student newspaper). SNHU also publishes The Penmen Review, an online creative writing journal for students and alumni.

Athletics 
Southern New Hampshire University participates in NCAA Division II athletics. It is a member of the Eastern College Athletic Conference and the Northeast-10 Conference. The teams' nickname, the Penmen, is an homage to the university's history as an accounting school. The university's mascot is named "Petey Penmen".

Lou D'Allesandro was appointed the first athletic director and head coach of the men's basketball team in 1963. Future NBA head coach P.J. Carlesimo coached the men's basketball team during the 1975–1976 season, compiling a 14–13 record and winning the Mayflower Conference championship.

The Stan Spirou Field House is named after longtime men's basketball coach Stan Spirou, whose career spanned from 1985 to 2018. He is considered one of the most successful NCAA Division II basketball coaches, compiling a career winning percentage of .652 (522–279), four New England Collegiate Conference Coach of the Year awards (1993, 1994, 1995, 1999), and was named National Coach of the Year in 1994 by Division II Bulletin. His teams have averaged 22 wins per season and also have 14 NCAA tournament appearances, four NCAA regional titles, and six NECC tournament championships.

In 1989, when it was known as New Hampshire College, the Penmen won their first NCAA Men's Soccer Championship, against UNC Greensboro. In 2002, the men's soccer team returned to the NCAA Division II championship game, but lost to Sonoma State. On December 7, 2013, the Penmen won their second NCAA men's soccer national title, defeating Carson-Newman, 2-1.

SNHU is a recipient of the NCAA Foundation Academic Achievement Award, which recognizes high graduation rates among student athletes. SNHU took home the award for the highest graduation rate among all Division II institutions. SNHU also earned the Northeast-10 Conference Academic Achievement Award after the 2001–02 school year.

List of teams

Men's sports (8)
Baseball
Basketball
Cross country
Golf
Ice hockey
Lacrosse
Soccer
Tennis

Women's sports (11)
Basketball
Cheerleading 
Cross country
Field hockey
Lacrosse
Soccer
Softball
Tennis
Track and field 
Volleyball

Athletic facilities
Dr. George J. Larkin Field (soccer, lacrosse, field hockey, intramurals)
Ice Den (ice hockey)
Lake Sunapee Country Club / Concord Country Club (golf)
Penmen Stadium (soccer, lacrosse, field hockey, tennis, track & field)
SNHU Baseball Field
SNHU Softball Field
Stan Spirou Field House (basketball, volleyball)
Tennis Courts (tennis)

Notable alumni

 Rebecca Adamson (born 1950), Cherokee businessperson and advocate
 Felix G. Arroyo (born 1979), former Boston city councilor
 Preston Burpo (born 1972), former MLS player and goalkeeping coach for the New York Red Bulls
 Chuck Collins (born 1959), author, co-founder of United for a Fair Economy, and senior scholar at the Institute for Policy Studies
 Ed Davis (born 1956), former commissioner of the Boston Police Department
 Elaine Duke (born 1958), former U.S. Deputy Secretary of Homeland Security
 Jack Flanagan (born 1957), former New Hampshire state representative
 Ron Fortier (born 1946), comic book writer
 Peter Holland (born 1991), professional hockey player
 Marjoie Kilkelly, former Maine state senator and state representative
Marjorie Herrera Lewis (born 1957), author
 Stephen D. Lovejoy, former Maine state representative
 Paul Mark, current Massachusetts state representative
 Garrett Mason (born 1985), former Maine state senator
 Peggy Morgan (born 1981), professional mixed martial artist
 Marc R. Pacheco (born 1952), current Massachusetts state senator and former state representative
 Pam Patenaude (born 1961), former U.S. Deputy Secretary of Housing and Urban Development
 Rob Paternostro (born 1973), former professional basketball player and head coach of the Leicester Riders
 Benjamin Ramos (born 1956), former Pennsylvania state representative
 Annette Robinson (born 1940), former New York state assemblywoman
 Abuhena Saifulislam (born 1963), U.S. Navy chaplain serving with troops in the Marine Corps
 Mohd Sidek Hassan (born 1951), chairman of Petronas, former president of the International Islamic University Malaysia, and 12th Chief Secretary to the Government of Malaysia 
 Samia Suluhu (born 1960), current president and former vice president of Tanzania, the first woman to hold either these positions
 Chris Tsonis (born 1991), professional soccer player
 Tate Westbrook, U.S. Navy officer who commanded the USS Spruance (DDG-111) from 2010 to 2012
 Corey Wilson (born 1985), U.S. Marine Corps veteran and former Maine state representative

References

External links

Official athletics website

 
1932 establishments in New Hampshire
Air traffic controller schools
Aviation schools in the United States
Educational buildings in Manchester, New Hampshire
Educational institutions established in 1932
Hooksett, New Hampshire
Universities and colleges in Hillsborough County, New Hampshire
Universities and colleges in Merrimack County, New Hampshire
Private universities and colleges in New Hampshire